Print capitalism is a theory underlying the concept of a nation, as a group that forms an imagined community, that emerges with a common language and discourse that is generated from the use of the printing press, proliferated by a capitalist marketplace. Capitalist entrepreneurs printed their books and media in the vernacular (instead of exclusive script languages, such as Latin) in order to maximize circulation. As a result, readers speaking various local dialects became able to understand each other, and a common discourse emerged. Anderson argued that the first European nation-states were thus formed around their "national print-languages."

Terminology
The term was coined by Benedict Anderson, and explained in depth in his book Imagined Communities in 1983.

Development of the modern nation-state
The printing press is widely credited for modern nationalism and the birth of the nation-state as the primary actors in political legitimacy. Soon after the invention of the Gutenberg-style printing press in 1454, literature such as the Bible was printed in vernaculars. The publication of the 95 Theses in 1517 sparked the Reformation, under which Europe went through 200 years of warfare that led to the gradual establishment of the nation-state as the powers that were dominant, over the previous dominance of the Roman Catholic Church. Print capitalism continues to influence the development of nationalism through the spread of the printing press.

References

Political science terminology